The Brides of Sodom is an American horror film that was written and directed by Creep Creepersin. The film starred Domiziano Arcangeli, David Taylor and Rachel Zeskind. The Brides of Sodom was produced by Empire Films and Sterling Entertainment and features gay-for-pay porn idol, David Taylor in his first main role in a feature film.

Plot 
After the world has ended, a group of vampires feed on the last remaining humans left on the planet. Confusion arises when one of the lead vampires falls in love with a human that is meant for food.

Cast 
Domiziano Arcangeli
David Taylor
Rachel Zeskind
Dylan Vox
Beverly Lynne
Peter Stickles
Quentin Elias
Robin Bain
Jacqui Holland
Tara Alexis
Jess Allen
Esther Canata
Elina Madison
Shon Lange
Brad Potts
Dahlia Dark
Marta Zolynska
Jeffrey James Lippold
Krista Jacobson

References

External links
 

2010s English-language films
American independent films
2013 independent films
American science fiction horror films
American vampire films
2013 films
LGBT-related science fiction horror films
2010s science fiction horror films
2013 LGBT-related films
American exploitation films
American post-apocalyptic films
American dystopian films
American romantic horror films
2010s American films